LaFollette is a city in Campbell County, Tennessee, United States. Its population was 7,456 at the 2010 census, with an estimated population in 2018 of 6,737. It is the principal city of the LaFollette, Tennessee micropolitan statistical area, which includes all of Campbell County, and is a component of the Knoxville-Sevierville-LaFollette combined statistical area. While the city's official spelling is one word ("LaFollette")—after its founders, Harvey Marion LaFollette and his younger brother Grant LaFollette—several federal agencies spell the city's name with two words ("La Follette").

History
Harvey and Grant LaFollette purchased  at Big Creek Gap, where the present community lies, around 1890. They founded the LaFollette Coal, Iron, and Railway Company to exploit mineral resources they had found. Although the business failed during the 1920s, the community continued to grow. The city of LaFollette was incorporated in 1897.

Geography
LaFollette is located near the geographic center of Campbell County at  (36.375006, −84.127623). The city is situated in Powell Valley, where the Appalachian Ridge-and-Valley province gives way to the Cumberland Plateau region. Cumberland Mountain, a  ridge stretching from Cumberland Gap in the east to Bruce Gap in the west, rises north of LaFollette. Norris Lake dominates the area to the south. Jacksboro lies adjacent to LaFollette to the southwest. A leg of the Cumberland Trail is accessible off Tennessee Avenue at the north end of LaFollette.

U.S. Route 25W and State Routes 9 and 63 run concurrently through the community.

Demographics

2020 census

As of the 2020 United States census, there were 7,430 people, 2,797 households, and 1,821 families residing in the city.

2000 census
As of the census of 2000,  7,926 people, 3,422 households, and 2,135 families were residing in the city. The population density was 1,624.7 people/sq mi (627.1/km2). The 3,779 housing units averaged 774.6/sq mi (299.0/km2). The racial makeup of the city was 97.89% White, 0.54% African American, 0.40% Native American, 0.18% Asian, 0.22% from other races, and 0.77% from two or more races. Hispanics or Latinos of any race were 0.42% of the population.

Of the 3,422 households,  26.5% had children under 18 living with them, 39.8% were married couples living together, 17.9% had a female householder with no husband present, and 37.6% were not families. About 34.5% of all households were made up of individuals, and 17.5% had someone living alone who was 65 or older. The average household size was 2.24, and the average family size was 2.86.

In the city, the age distribution was 22.0% under 18, 8.7% from 18 to 24, 25.5% from 25 to 44, 22.6% from 45 to 64, and 21.2% who were 65  or older. The median age was 40 years. For every 100 females, there were 82.8 males. For every 100 females age 18 and over, there were 78.1 males.

The median income for a household in the city was $18,370, and for a family was $24,235. Males had a median income of $25,541 versus $18,835 for females. The per capita income for the city was $13,355. About 28.3% of families and 33.1% of the population were below the poverty line, including 48.7% of those under age 18 and 21.1% of those age 65 or over.

Notable people
 Adele Arakawa, television news anchor
 Howard "Louie Bluie" Armstrong, musician
 Haskel Ayers, businessman and politician
 The Isaacs, a Southern gospel/bluegrass family singing group
 Carl Stiner, U.S. Army general
 J. Will Taylor, congressman

References

External links

 
 Municipal Technical Advisory Service entry for LaFollette — information on local government, elections, and link to charter
 LaFollette Press newspaper
 An essay on local radio in LaFollette in the 1950s and 1960s, including original audio: Hanson, Bradley, "The Tennessee Jamboree: Local Radio, the Barn Dance, and Cultural Life in Appalachian East Tennessee," Southern Spaces, November 20, 2008.

Cities in Tennessee
Cities in Campbell County, Tennessee
Populated places established in 1897
Coal towns in Tennessee
Cities in Knoxville metropolitan area